Ronald Nored (born March 1, 1990) is an American basketball coach, currently an assistant coach for the Indiana Pacers of the National Basketball Association (NBA). Previously he served as the head coach of the Long Island Nets of the NBA G League, and an assistant coach for the Maine Red Claws of the Boston Celtics organization. He is a former point guard for Butler University's basketball team.

Playing career

High school
Nored starred as an all-state point guard for Homewood High School in Homewood, Alabama, averaging 15.3 points and 6.9 rebounds per game as a senior, when he led the team to a 31–5 record and a state finals appearance in 2008. His career-high game came as a junior when he scored 38 points against Briarwood Christian High School. During his senior year, Nored made a verbal commitment to Western Kentucky University, but backed out after coach Darrin Horn left for the University of South Carolina. He turned down an academic scholarship to Harvard University and basketball offers from Samford University and the University of South Alabama to instead play for Brad Stevens at Butler, just a few miles away from his grandparents' house in Indianapolis.

College
Quickly establishing himself as a tenacious defender and a vocal court leader, Nored started all 32 games in his freshman season. His season-high game came when he went 4-for-4 from the court, including the game-winning shot, in an 11-point night against Cleveland State. In his sophomore season he was named the Horizon League's co-defensive player of the year and the league's all-tournament team. He recorded a career-high 8 assists in a home win over Wright State. His high-scoring night came against Illinois–Chicago with 16 points. He scored 15 points and had 6 assists in Butler's 2nd-round NCAA tournament victory over Murray State and grabbed five steals against Syracuse in the West Region semifinal. He scored 7 points with 6 rebounds in the loss to Duke in the championship game.
As a junior, Nored averaged 5.0 points per game with a high of 16 against Utah. He helped Butler return to the title game of the NCAA tournament, but failed to score from the field, earning all 6 of his tournament points at the free-throw line. He did get two steals and four rebounds in 26 minutes against Connecticut in the title game.

Coaching career
After graduating, Nored coached at Brownsburg High School in Indiana and college basketball at the University of South Alabama, briefly before Brad Stevens, his former college coach at Butler University, offered him a coaching position with the Boston Celtics. He served as a coach for the Maine Red Claws of the NBA D-League from 2013-2015. On April 28, 2015, Nored was named as an assistant coach for Northern Kentucky University.  On April 15, 2016, the Brooklyn Nets hired him to be the first head coach for the Long Island Nets.

Personal life
Nored grew up in Birmingham, Alabama, where his father, Ron Nored, Sr., was pastor of Bethel AME Church in Ensley and a co-founder and executive director of Bethel-Ensley Action Task (BEAT). Nored, Sr., died from pancreatic cancer in 2003. Ron is happily married to Danielle Eng, a former accountant for RSM. With two children, Avery and Kai.

References

1990 births
Living people
American men's basketball players
Basketball coaches from Alabama
Basketball players from Alabama
Basketball players from Indianapolis
Butler Bulldogs men's basketball players
High school basketball coaches in the United States
Long Island Nets coaches
Maine Red Claws coaches
Northern Kentucky Norse men's basketball coaches
People from Homewood, Alabama
Point guards